Wilbur Louis Adams (October 23, 1884 – December 4, 1937) was an American lawyer and politician from Wilmington, in New Castle County, Delaware. He was a member of the Democratic Party, who served as U.S. Representative from Delaware.

Early life
Adams was born in Georgetown, Delaware, son of William Dunning Adams and Sarah Lavinia (Thompson) Adams. He had attended Delaware College in Newark and Dickinson College in Carlisle, Pennsylvania. In 1907 he graduated from the University of Pennsylvania School of Law at Philadelphia, was admitted to the Delaware Bar, and began the practice of law in Wilmington.

Political career
Adams was an unsuccessful candidate for election as state Attorney General in 1924.

In 1932, the incumbent Republican U.S. Representative, Robert G. Houston, was involved in an intra-party dispute over prohibition and failed to win the Republican nomination. As a result, Adams was able to win a narrow victory, and was elected to the U.S. House of Representatives in 1932, defeating Republican Reuben Satterthwaite Jr. Adams served with the Democratic majority in the 73rd Congress. In the U.S. House, Adams voted with the straight New Deal program. He served from March 4, 1933 until January 3, 1935, during the administration of U.S. President Franklin D. Roosevelt.

In 1934, Adams decided not to seek reelection, but rather to challenge the popular incumbent U.S. Senator John G. Townsend Jr. for his U.S. Senate seat. A thoughtful moderate Republican, Townsend had supported much of the New Deal legislation, and had demonstrated considerable effectiveness through his involvement in the establishment of such things as the Federal Deposit Insurance Corporation. By contrast, Adams had a low profile in the House of Representatives and Townsend was able to raise questions about Adams' effectiveness for Delaware. Once again bucking national trends, Delaware had its own local Republican landslide in 1934, led by Townsend. Adams came home and moved to Georgetown, Delaware where he continued the practice of law. He was also the acting Postmaster at Georgetown, from May 6, 1937, until his death.

Death and legacy
Adams died at the Beebe Hospital, Lewes, Delaware. He is buried in the Union Cemetery, located at South Race Street, Georgetown.

Almanac
Elections are held the first Tuesday after November 1. U.S. Representatives took office March 4 and have a two-year term. Since 1935 all Congressional terms began January 3.

References

Images
 Encyclopedia Dickinsonia

External links
Biographical Directory of the United States Congress 
Delaware's Members of Congress 
Encyclopedia Dickinsonia .

The Political Graveyard 

 

1884 births
1937 deaths
People from Wilmington, Delaware
People from Georgetown, Delaware
Dickinson College alumni
University of Pennsylvania Law School alumni
Delaware lawyers
Burials in Sussex County, Delaware
Democratic Party members of the United States House of Representatives from Delaware
American postmasters
20th-century American politicians
20th-century American lawyers